Gamma Velorum is a quadruple star system in the constellation Vela. This name is the Bayer designation for the star, which is Latinised from γ Velorum and abbreviated γ Vel. At a combined magnitude of +1.7, it is one of the brightest stars in the night sky, and contains by far the closest and brightest Wolf–Rayet star. It has the traditional name Suhail al Muhlif and the modern name Regor , but neither is approved by the International Astronomical Union.

The γ Velorum system includes a pair of stars separated by 41″, each of which is also a spectroscopic binary system. γ2 Velorum, the brighter of the visible pair, contains the Wolf–Rayet star and a blue supergiant, while γ1 Velorum contains a blue giant and an unseen companion.

Distance
Gamma Velorum is close enough to have accurate parallax measurements as well as distance estimates by more indirect means. The Hipparcos parallax for γ2 implies a distance of 342 parsecs (pc). A dynamical parallax derived from calculations of the orbital parameters gives a value of 336 pc, similar to spectrophotometric derivations. A VLTI interferometry measurement of the distance gives a slightly larger value of 368 ± 51 pc. All these distances are somewhat less than the commonly assumed distance of 450 pc for the Vela OB2 association which is the closest grouping of young massive stars.

Stellar system
The Gamma Velorum system is composed of at least four stars. The brightest member, γ2 Velorum or γ Velorum A, is a spectroscopic binary composed of a blue supergiant of spectral class O7.5, and a massive Wolf–Rayet star (originally ). The binary has an orbital period of 78.5 days and separation varying from 0.8 to 1.6 astronomical units. The Wolf–Rayet star is likely to end its life in a Type Ib supernova explosion; it is one of the nearest supernova candidates to the Sun. The Wolf–Rayet star has traditionally been regarded as the primary since its emission lines dominate the spectrum, but the O star is visually brighter and also more luminous. For clarity, the components are now often referred to as WR and O.

The bright (apparent magnitude +4.2) γ1 Velorum or γ Velorum B, is a spectroscopic binary with a period of 1.48 days. Only the primary is detected and it is a blue-white giant. It is separated from the Wolf–Rayet binary by 41.2″, easily resolved with binoculars. The pair are too close to be separated without optical assistance, and they appear to the naked eye as a single star of apparent magnitude 1.72 (at the average brightness of γ2 of 1.83).

Gamma Velorum has several fainter companions that share a common motion and are likely to be members of the Vela OB2 association. The magnitude +7.3 CD-46 3848 is a white F0 star at is 62.3 arcseconds from the A component. At 93.5 arcseconds is another binary star, an F0 star of magnitude +9.2.

Gamma Velorum is associated with several hundred pre-main-sequence stars within less than a degree. The ages of these stars would be at least 5 million years.

Etymology
The Arabic name is al Suhail al Muḥlīf. al Muhlif refers to the oath-taker, and al Suhail is originally derived from a word meaning the plain. Suhail is used for at least three other stars: Canopus, λ Velorum (al Suhail al Wazn) and ζ Puppis (Suhail Hadar). Suhail is also a common Arabic male first name.

The name Regor ("Roger" spelled in reverse) was invented as a practical joke by the Apollo 1 astronaut Gus Grissom for his fellow astronaut Roger Chaffee.

Due to the exotic nature of its spectrum (bright emission lines in lieu of dark absorption lines) it is also dubbed the Spectral Gem of Southern Skies.

See also
 Gamma Cassiopeiae, informally named Navi for astronaut Virgil Ivan "Gus" Grissom
 Iota Ursae Majoris, informally named Dnoces for astronaut Ed White

References

O-type giants
B-type giants
Wolf–Rayet stars
Spectroscopic binaries
6
Gum Nebula

Vela (constellation)
Velorum, Gamma
3207
Durchmusterung objects
068273
039953
Regor
TIC objects
Southern pole stars